The Justice (Northern Ireland) Act 2004 (c 4) is an Act of the Parliament of the United Kingdom.

Section 19 - Commencement
The following orders have been made under this section:
The Justice (Northern Ireland) Act 2004 (Commencement) Order 2004 (S.R. 2004/267 (C. 10))
The Justice (Northern Ireland) Act 2004 (Commencement No. 2) Order 2004 (S.R. 2004/432 (C. 23))
The Justice (Northern Ireland) Act 2004 (Commencement No. 3) Order 2005 (S.R. 2005/282 (C. 22))
The Justice (Northern Ireland) Act 2004 (Commencement No. 4) Order 2010 (S.R. 2010/114 (C. 8))

References
Halsbury's Statutes,

External links
The Justice (Northern Ireland) Act 2004, as amended from the National Archives.
The Justice (Northern Ireland) Act 2004, as originally enacted from the National Archives.
Explanatory notes to the Justice (Northern Ireland) Act 2004.

United Kingdom Acts of Parliament 2004
Acts of the Parliament of the United Kingdom concerning Northern Ireland
2004 in Northern Ireland